The Vilppula railway station (Filppula until May 1897) is located in the town of Mänttä-Vilppula, Finland, in the district and former municipality of Vilppula. It is located along the Tampere–Haapamäki railway, and its neighboring stations are Kolho in the north and Orivesi Central in the south.

Services 
All regional trains on the route Tampere–Haapamäki–Keuruu–Jyväskylä stop at Vilppula; the default type of rolling stock for this route is the Dm12 railbus. All services arrive to and depart from track 1.

External links

References 

Mänttä-Vilppula
Railway stations in Pirkanmaa